Football Club de Metz, commonly referred to as FC Metz  or simply Metz, is a French association football club based in Metz, Lorraine. The club was formed in 1932 and plays in Ligue 2, the second division in the French football league system. They plays its home matches at Stade Saint-Symphorien located within the city. The team is currently managed by László Bölöni. Despite never winning the top flight, they have won the Coupe de France twice and the Coupe de la Ligue twice.

History
FC Metz was founded in 1932 by the amalgamation of two amateur athletic clubs, and shortly thereafter became a professional team; it is one of the oldest professional football teams in France. Its roots trace back further, to the SpVgg Metz club, formed in 1905 when the city of Metz was part of the German Empire. SpVgg played in the tier-one Westkreis-Liga for a season in 1913–14, before the outbreak of the First World War stopped all play. Some players of this club were part of the Cercle Athlétique Messin in 1919, which went on to become FC Metz in 1932. Messin was a leading club in the Division d'Honneur – Lorraine, taking out league titles in 1920, 1921, 1922, 1924, 1926, 1927, 1929 and 1931.

The club played in the French second division north from 1933, winning the league in 1935 and earning promotion to Ligue 1 for the first time. The team became a mid-table side in the first division until the outbreak of the war interfered with play once more. FCM did not take part in the top-tier regional competitions in 1939–40.

During World War II, the Moselle département being annexed by Germany, the club had to play under the Germanised name of FV Metz in the Gauliga Westmark. In the three completed seasons of this league from 1941 to 1944, the club finished runners-up each year.

Despite the city of Metz being retaken by allied forces in autumn 1944, the club did not take part in French league football in 1944–45 but returned to Ligue 1 in 1945–46, to come 17th out of 18 clubs. An expansion of the league to 20 clubs meant, the team was not relegated and stayed at the highest level until 1950, when a last place finish ended its Ligue 1 membership. Metz was allowed to stay within Ligue 1 as a special privilege due to its catastrophic situation in the year following the war: the stadium had been damaged, almost beyond repair. The team had to start from scratch once again.

The club rebounded immediately, finishing second in Ligue 2, behind Lyon and returned to the first division. FC Metz made a strong return to this league, finishing fifth in its first season back. After this, the club once more had to battle against relegation season-by-season, finishing second-last in 1958 and having to return to Ligue 2. It took three seasons in this league before it could manage to return to Ligue 1 in 1961, but lasted for only one year in the top flight. FC Metz spent the next five seasons at second division level.

FC Metz ascended to the top level of French football once more in 1967; the team remained in the highest division until they were relegated in 2001, although they bounced back immediately and returned to the Ligue 1 the following year.

After losing the first leg of their 1984–85 European Cup Winners' Cup tie 4–2 to Barcelona at Stade Saint-Symphorien, FC Metz were widely expected to be thrashed at Camp Nou. However, a hat-trick from Yugoslav striker Tony Kurbos gave Les Grenats a shock 4–1 win in the second leg to send the French side through 6–5 on aggregate.

In 1998, the team competed in the qualifications to the UEFA Champions League, but lost in the third round to Finnish team HJK Helsinki. In 2006, FC Metz were relegated from Ligue 1, finishing at the bottom of the table, despite the regular presence of an extremely promising prospect, Miralem Pjanić, who would later be transferred to giants Lyon, for an astonishing fee of €7.5 million. At the end of the 2011–12 season, Metz finished 18th in Ligue 2 and were relegated to the Championnat National, the third tier of French football after a 1–1 draw with Tours at home on 20 May 2012, in very tense circumstances. Metz spent only one season at this level, rebuilding a team with iconic former player Albert Cartier as coach, winning promotion to Ligue 2, and then immediately finishing first and winning promotion to Ligue 1. Unfortunately, the team was relegated again to Ligue 2, but won promotion the next season. This time, Metz managed to secure a 14th place finish, ensuring another season in Ligue 1. For the 2017–18 Ligue 1 season, Metz endured a horrid campaign, losing eleven out of their first twelve matches. The club recovered later in the season but finished bottom of the table and were relegated back to Ligue 2.

On 26 April 2019, Metz were promoted back to Ligue 1 at the first time of asking by finishing first in Ligue 2. The promotion was confirmed with a 2–1 victory over Red Star.
In the clubs first season back in the top flight, Metz finished 15th on the table followed by an improved 10th place finish the following season. In the 2021–22 Ligue 1 season, Metz finished 19th and were relegated back to Ligue 2.

Stadium
FC Metz plays its home matches at Stade Saint-Symphorien, which has a capacity of 25,636. Thus, it is the largest venue dedicated to football in Lorraine.

Crest
Its official colours are grenat (maroon) and white, from which the team derives its nickname Les Grenats.  The team's crest features the Lorraine cross, symbolic of the team's regional affiliation, and the dragon called the Graoully, which in local legend was tamed by Saint Clement of Metz.

Youth academy
FC Metz also gained recognition in France and Europe for its successful youth academy, which produced star players including: Rigobert Song, Robert Pires, Louis Saha, Emmanuel Adebayor, Papiss Cissé, Miralem Pjanić, Kalidou Koulibaly, and Sadio Mané. The city's proximity to Luxembourg (about 55 km) plays a significant role in the importation of young prospects. The club's board has close ties with the Luxembourgish Football Federation. Nicolas "Nico" Braun, the team's top all-time goalscorer, as well as Pjanić or, closer to our times, Chris Philipps, have played in the G-D's amateur leagues before joining "les Grenats". Despite this, not all Luxembourgers enjoy success with Metz, with Robert "Robby" Langers as the best example.

FC Metz in European football

Honours
FC Metz has never won the French championship; its best result was a second-place finish in 1998, behind RC Lens. The title race lasted until the ultimate fixture, however Metz never recovered from a 0–2 loss against Lens on their home turf.  Metz won the Coupe de France twice, in 1984 and 1988, the first of these victories enabled it to qualify for the European Cup Winners' Cup where it achieved arguably the team's greatest moment, an upset of FC Barcelona in the first round of the competition in October 1984. It lost 4–2 at home in the first leg but won 4–1 away in the return leg, thus qualifying 6–5 on aggregate, making the FC Metz unique among the French teams who have beaten Barcelona at the Nou Camp. FC Metz also won the Coupe de la Ligue twice, in 1986 and 1996, and has made a total of ten appearances in European tournaments.

Ligue 1
Runners-up (1): 1997–98
Ligue 2

Winners (4): 1934–35, 2006–07, 2013–14, 2018–19

Coupe de France
Winners (2): 1983–84, 1987–88
Runners-up (1): 1937–38
Coupe de la Ligue
Winners (2): 1985–86, 1995–96
Runners-up (1): 1998–99
UEFA Intertoto Cup
Runners-up (1): 1999

Players

Current squad

Out on loan

Notable players
Below are the notable former players who have represented Metz in league and international competition since the club's foundation in 1932. To appear in the section below, a player must have played at least a full season for the club.

 Emmanuel Adebayor
 Wilmer Aguirre
 Sébastien Bassong
 Patrick Battiston
 Eric Black
 Jocelyn Blanchard
 Danny Boffin
 Nico Braun
 Albert Cartier
 Papiss Cissé
 Hugo Curioni
 Mathieu Dossevi
 Michel Ettore
 Philippe Gaillot
 Daniel Gygax
 Philippe Hinschberger
 Szabolcs Huszti
 Ahn Jung-hwan
 Henryk Kasperczak
 Sylvain Kastendeuch
 Eiji Kawashima
 Kalidou Koulibaly
 Lionel Letizi
 Sadio Mané
 Frédéric Meyrieu
 Faryd Mondragón
 Tressor Moreno
 Ludovic Obraniak
 Oguchi Onyewu
 Michele Padovano
 Pascal Pierre
 Robert Pires
 Miralem Pjanić
 Grégory Proment
 André Rey
 Franck Ribéry
 Jean-Philippe Rohr
 Louis Saha
 Franck Signorino
 Rigobert Song
 Jacques Songo'o
 Luc Sonor
 Jeff Strasser
 Marian Szeja
 Sylvain Wiltord
 Bernard Zénier

Current technical staff

Managerial history

References

External links

 

 
Sport in Metz
Football clubs in Grand Est
Association football clubs established in 1932
1932 establishments in France
Ligue 1 clubs
Football clubs from former German territories